Tveit Church may refer to:

 Tveit Church (Agder), a church in Kristiansand municipality in Agder county, Norway
 Tveit Church (Vestland), a church in Askøy municipality in Vestland county, Norway

See also 
 Austad Church (Bygland), a church in the village of Tveit in Bygland municipality in Agder county, Norway